Opercularia is a genus of perennial and subshrub flowering plants in the family Rubiaceae. There are about 15 species, all of which are endemic to Australia. Many of the species have an unpleasant odour.

Species include:
Opercularia acolytantha 
Opercularia apiciflora 
Opercularia aspera  – coarse stinkweed 
Opercularia diphylla 
Opercularia echinocephala  – bristly-headed stinkweed 
Opercularia hirsuta  – silky-haired stinkweed 
Opercularia hispidula  – hairy stinkweed, hispid stinkweed 
Opercularia liberiflora 
Opercularia ovata 
Opercularia rubioides  
Opercularia scabrida 
Opercularia spermacocea  
Opercularia vaginata  – dog weed 
Opercularia varia  – variable stinkweed
Opercularia volubilis  – twining stinkweed

References

 
Rubiaceae genera